Malpais may refer to:

 6370 Malpais, a main-belt asteroid
 Malpais, Costa Rica
 Malpais–St Michiel Important Bird Area, Curaçao

See also

 Malpaís (disambiguation)